On 17 October 2017, insurgents attacked Gardez, Paktia Province and Ghazni Province in Afghanistan.

Background 
In 2017, insurgents carried out many attacks in Afghanistan, including several in October. Major attacks included a double suicide bombing on 19 October in Kandahar Province which killed 43 Afghan soldiers and suicide bombings on 20 October in Kabul and Ghor Province which killed at least 60 people.

Attacks 
On 17 October 2017, an insurgent attack occurred at a police training centre in Gardez, Paktia Province. A suicide car bombing was followed by a gun attack. This killed at least 41 people, including the local police chief; 110 civilians and 48 police officers were injured. The Taliban claimed responsibility.

On the same day in Ghazni Province, armoured Humvee vehicles filled with explosives were detonated near the provincial governor's office, who were followed by gunmen. They killed 30 people - mostly security personnel; at least 10 other people were injured. The attackers are believed to have been Taliban members.

References

2017 murders in Afghanistan
21st century in Ghazni Province
21st century in Paktia Province